The First Presbyterian Church is an historic congregation currently housed at 1390 North State Street in Jackson, Mississippi. It was founded in 1837.

Description 
First Presbyterian Church is the largest Presbyterian church in Mississippi and a flagship and founding congregation of the Presbyterian Church in America. Its communicant membership is over 2,500.

With 3,100 members, it has become the largest Presbyterian congregation in Mississippi and one of the largest in the United States. It has played a significant role in the establishment of the Presbyterian Church in America (PCA), and the congregation has remained one of the flagship congregations of that denomination.  The church played a significant role of establishing the Winter Theological Institution in 1962, which became Reformed Theological Seminary.

Doctrine
The congregation adheres to the Westminster Confession of Faith.

The church describes itself " A steadfast witness to historic Reformed Christianity for over 175 years".

It is a member of the Mississippi Valley Presbytery.

References

External links

1837 establishments in Mississippi
Presbyterian megachurches in the United States
Religious organizations established in 1837
Religious buildings and structures in Jackson, Mississippi
Presbyterian Church in America churches in Mississippi
Churches in Hinds County, Mississippi